Handforth Dean is a retail park in Handforth, Cheshire, England, which opened in 1995, alongside the A34 bypass. It contains four superstores: Marks & Spencer, Tesco Extra, JD Sports and Boots. A large Next store and Pets at Home store are on a development adjacent to the retail park. In 2007, the Tesco store had a second floor added to handle the number of customers that used it and was converted into a Tesco Extra. Tesco has described Handforth Dean as its "flagship store". In 2002, the Marks & Spencer store was the company's most profitable outside London. It is also one of their largest stores in the country.
Handforth Dean, named after Dean Smith of Handforth, Wilmslow, Cheshire. SK9 3SD. 1967

References 

Retail parks in the United Kingdom